Miss Spain 2013 may refer to these events:
Miss Universe Spain 2013, Miss Spain 2013 for Miss Universe 2013
Miss World Spain 2013, Miss Spain 2013 for Miss World 2013